This is a list of video games based on the Dungeons & Dragons fantasy tabletop role-playing game, including computer games, console games, arcade games, and mobile games.

Licensing history

The first Dungeons & Dragons licensed games were made by Mattel for the Intellivision.  The contract actually required some variations to the normal Intellivision title screens with the name being capitalized and the addition of the word 'cartridge'.  The games, however, had nothing to do with the rules or any of the settings.

Up until 1987, a number of games inspired by Dungeons & Dragons had appeared, such as the Wizardry and Ultima series, but these were not licensed from TSR. TSR considered making their own video games and passed on the idea, and instead announced in 1987 that it was looking for a game development partner to make officially-licensed games. At least ten different companies applied, including Electronic Arts and Origin Systems, but TSR awarded the contract to Strategic Simulations, Inc. (SSI) primarily because of their broader vision and their experience in computerized wargaming. After a successful run with their Gold Box series of games, SSI lost their exclusive license in 1994. TSR then divided the license among multiple publishers.

TSR awarded Interplay Productions, Inc. a license to use the Forgotten Realms and Planescape trademarks and associated properties for use in computer and video game products. Within Interplay, a division named Black Isle Studios used this license arrangement to develop a series of successful games based upon the two D&D settings. They also published the Baldur's Gate series developed by the Canadian company BioWare. In 2003, Interplay ran into financial difficulties, resulting in the closure of Black Isle Studios. Their next planned D&D video game, code-named "Jefferson," was canceled as a result of legal issues with Wizards of the Coast, the new rights holders to the D&D franchise.

Wizards of the Coast purchased TSR, the makers of Dungeons & Dragons, in 1997. They in turn were acquired by Hasbro in 1999. As a result, the subsidiary Hasbro Interactive gained the right to use the Dungeons & Dragons game brand in their video game products. In 2001, facing financial difficulties, Hasbro sold 100% of Hasbro Interactive to French software concern Infogrames Entertainment, SA in a US$100 million deal. This led to the publication of Neverwinter Nights in 2002, a game also developed by Bioware.

List of games
Sorted by setting (also known as game worlds).

Forgotten Realms 
The majority of D&D video games are set in the Forgotten Realms setting, and since 2007 all D&D video games have been set there.

Dragonlance

Mystara

Dark Sun

Ravenloft

Greyhawk 
Greyhawk was the original Advanced Dungeons & Dragons setting. It was superseded by the Forgotten Realms around 1985, but it became the official default D&D setting in 2000. The Greyhawk video games were released shortly after.

Eberron

Other settings

Collections

See also
 Role-playing video game

References

External links
 
 Dominus Dracon Delectare – Dungeons & Dragons digital games and board games

List
Dungeons and Dragons computer and video games